Barrett Reid AM (1926–1995) was an Australian librarian, poet and literary editor.

Early life
He grew up in Brisbane and moved to Melbourne in the early 1950s where he started working at the State Library of Victoria.

Poet
Reid, Barrett, (1995). Making country. Sydney: Angus and Robertson

Editor
Overland 1988–1993 (244 issues)

Barjai Barrett Reid (editor), Laurence Collinson (editor), Brisbane :Barjai Publishing Service, 1943–1947 periodical (15 issues)

Ern Malley's Journal Max Harris (editor), Barrett Reid (editor), John Reed (editor), 1952 periodical (4 issues)

Letters of John Reed : Defining Australian Cultural Life 1920–1981 John Reed, Nancy Underhill (editor), Barrett Reid (editor),Ringwood : Viking, 2001

Honours and legacy
On Australia Day 1983, Reid was appointed a Member of the Order of Australia (AM) for services to librarianship.

The State Library of Victoria Barrett Reid Scholarship is awarded to Victorian public library employees to assist with professional development activities.

References

1926 births
1995 deaths
Australian librarians
Members of the Order of Australia
People educated at Brisbane State High School
People from Brisbane